The Suzuki GW250 is a  entry-level standard motorcycle sold in multiple markets, including Australia, Asia and Europe. It is called the Inazuma 250 in the EU and the GSR250 in Japan. There is also an F (or) S version (250F, 250S) which is the faired version of the bike for some markets outside of the EU. It is used by various police services including China, Japan and USA. Due to EU safety regulations, Inazuma was discontinued in Europe, as ABS is mandatory from 1/2017 for all motorcycles with more than 125cc, and there are no plans for ABS equipped Inazuma.

On the instrument panel there is an analogue RPM meter in the centre, which contains a digital gear selector indicator. It also has a shift-light pre-programmed to light in three RPM ranges. The speedometer is digital, and there are two trip meters.

While it was praised in the media for having a high build quality and being easy to ride, it was criticised for having "overall sober styling".

References

External links
  /  at Suzuki UK
  /  at Suzuki USA
 Suzuki Inazuma 250 (2013-on) review

GW250
Standard motorcycles
Motorcycles powered by straight-twin engines